Raymond Ian Wilson  (born 21 January 1945) is a former Australian rules footballer who played for Hawthorn in the Victorian Football League (VFL).

Wilson, a wingman, made his debut for Hawthorn in 1966 and won that season's best and fairest award. He played on the interchange bench in Hawthorn's 1971 Grand Final win over St Kilda.

Before being recruited by Hawthorn he had captained University Blacks in the Victorian Amateur Football Association to the B Grade premiership in 1964 and the A Grade premiership the following year.

His son, Tony Wilson, is a writer, broadcaster and compere.

References

External links

1945 births
Australian rules footballers from Victoria (Australia)
Hawthorn Football Club players
Hawthorn Football Club Premiership players
Peter Crimmins Medal winners
University Blacks Football Club players
Living people
Recipients of the Medal of the Order of Australia
One-time VFL/AFL Premiership players